The Captive, formerly Queen of the Night and Captives, is a 2014 Canadian thriller film directed by Atom Egoyan with a script he co-wrote with David Fraser. The film stars Ryan Reynolds, Bruce Greenwood, Scott Speedman, Rosario Dawson, Mireille Enos, Kevin Durand, and Alexia Fast. It was selected to compete for the Palme d'Or in the main competition section at the 2014 Cannes Film Festival. The film was released in select theaters and on demand on December 12, 2014.

The film has a nonlinear presentation, and only context differentiates the current scenes from the flashbacks. Additionally, although the film takes place over eight years, all of the scenes take place during winter for dramatic effect.

Plot
In Niagara Falls, Ontario, homicide detective Jeffrey Cornwall interviews for a job with Nicole Dunlop in the Internet Child Exploitation Unit. He recoils in disgust after seeing the images related to an open case, but Nicole advises him these are the types of images he will have to see every day and not look away from.

Meanwhile, local contractor Matthew Lane picks up his 9-year-old daughter, Cassandra, after her figure skating practice. Matthew stops to pick up pie, leaving Cassandra in his truck. Minutes later, he returns to find her missing. He reports the abduction to the police station, where Jeffrey and Nicole are assigned to the case. They are skeptical of his story, which infuriates him. Cassandra's mother, Tina Lane, arrives and breaks down in rage at Matthew.

Eight years later, Matthew and Tina are estranged; she blames him for Cassandra's disappearance. Nicole and Jeffrey are now romantically involved. Tina meets with the police regularly to discuss their case but Matthew, originally a suspect, has become a vigilante in the search for Cassandra.

This entire time Cassandra has been held captive in the home of a child pornographer named Mika, who has installed remote cameras in the hotel rooms where Tina works as a chambermaid. Although Mika leaves his house to work and is no longer sexually interested in the now-teenaged Cassandra, the fear that he will harm her parents keeps Cassandra from escaping or seeking help.

Jeffrey finds recent photos of Cassandra online. Mika makes her tell stories on camera to lure in younger children. Nicole poses as a child, which allows her and Jeffrey to catch a child molester named Willy, as well as a group of others. The arrests put Nicole into the public eye. Mika visits Willy in prison and urges him not to take any deals for cooperation. Willy says he will only comply if someone kidnaps Nicole and forces her to reveal what in her past may have inspired her to pursue child protection.

Cassandra begins chatting online with a young girl, trying to entice her to meet. When Nicole arrives home, she finds Jeffrey using his own niece as bait to infiltrate the child porn community and immediately shuts off the web cam. Mika secretly turns the webcam back on to watch their fight and reconsiders Willy's offer regarding Nicole.

Nicole attends a dinner held in her honor where she is drugged and kidnapped by Vicky, a woman working for Mika.

While transporting trees in his truck, Matthew stays overnight at a motel.  He wakes to find the trees have been taken and left in a trail that ultimately leads him to a remote location where he finds Cassandra. Cassandra resists leaving with him and Matthew does not understand why until Mika appears and tranquilizes him; Mika had arranged the meeting to watch their reunion.

Mika locks Nicole in a van and tells her to tell her story into a microphone.

At the ice skating rink, Vicky questions Cassandra's former skating partner, Albert, about their history, pressuring him for details on how he was impacted by the disappearance. Matthew overhears this and follows Vicky to a restaurant, where he eavesdrops as Vicky plays a recording of her conversation with Albert for Mika. Matthew calls Jeffrey with their location and plants his phone's GPS on Mika's vehicle.

Matthew goads the diner staff to call the police by being disruptive. He confronts the abductors to buy more time and steals Vicky's cell phone. She and Mika chase Matthew in their vehicle, shooting at his truck. Matthew escapes by driving by the diner again, where multiple police cars have responded to the staff's earlier calls.

Jeffrey tracks Matthew's phone and locates Mika's house. Jeffrey is shot by Vicky before he kills her and fatally wounds Mika, who dies while being interrogated for Nicole's location. The Lane family is reunited at the police station and visit Jeffrey as he recovers in the hospital. The police finally find and rescue Nicole.

Cassandra skates at her old ice rink and smiles.

Cast

Production 
The shooting of the film began in February 2013 in Sudbury, Ontario.  Ahead of its première on 16 May 2014 at the Cannes Film Festival, distributor A24, in partnership with DirecTV, purchased the U.S. rights to the film.

Reception 
Before its release, the film had been received negatively.  Justin Chang from Variety described it as "a ludicrous abduction thriller that finds a once-great filmmaker slipping into previously un-entered realms of self-parody". Peter Bradshaw from The Guardian commented, "it looks worryingly as if Egoyan has taken a serious issue and burdened it to breaking point and beyond with his own indulgent, naïve and exploitative fantasies". Steven Zeitchik of the Los Angeles Times compliments moments when the film "hints at emotions and mysteries with a delightful subtlety for a while", but remarks that it includes "some wild plots and conspiracies that wouldn't be out of place in the most fantastical spy novel".

The film has a Rotten Tomatoes rating of 29% based on 55 reviews, with an average score of 4.3/10. The website's critics consensus states: "Wan and lugubrious, The Captive represents another atmospheric, beautifully filmed misfire from director Atom Egoyan." The film's Metacritic score is 36 out of 100 based on 20 reviews.

Release 
The film received a limited release in Canada on September 5, 2014 and earned a total of $450,000. The film was released on DirecTV
on November 13, 2014 due to A24's partnership with DirecTV. The film was released in select theaters and on demand beginning on December 12, 2014 in the United States.  The film was first made available to stream on Netflix and is currently available on HBO Max.

References

External links 
 
 
 
 The Captive at Library and Archives Canada

2014 films
2010s English-language films
English-language Canadian films
Films directed by Atom Egoyan
Films scored by Mychael Danna
Films about missing people
Films about human rights
2010s chase films
2010s road movies
Trucker films
Films shot in Greater Sudbury
2010s thriller films
Canadian thriller films
A24 (company) films
2010s Canadian films
2010s American films